Busher is a surname. Notable people with the surname include:

 Harold Busher (1876–1954), English cricketer
 Jerry Busher, American drummer
 Leonard Busher (fl. 1614), seventeenth-century English religious writer
 Sydney Busher (1882–1953), English cricketer

See also
 Bushe